Trifun is a Serbian male given name, a variant of the Greek name Tryphon.

Notable people with this name include:
 Trifun Kostovski (born 1946), Macedonian politician, businessman and singer
 Trifun Mihailović (born 1947), Serbian footballer
 Trifun Živanović (born 1975), American-born Serbian figure skater

See also
 Trifunović

Serbian masculine given names